The Prairie State Achievement Examination (PSAE) was a two-day standardized test taken by all high school Juniors in the U.S. state of Illinois. On the first day, students take the ACT, and on the second day, a WorkKeys examination and Illinois State Board of Education-developed science examination. The test is no longer administered in Illinois schools; however, it was required for all Illinois High School Students from 2001 to 2014.

Areas of assessment
The PSAE attempted to assess students in the areas of math, reading, science and writing.

Exemptions
Students were required to take the PSAE to achieve a high school diploma, unless they met one of the following requirements:
The student's Individualized Education Program is incompatible with the PSAE, and the test cannot be modified to comply. In this case, the student takes the Illinois Alternate Assessment instead.
The student is not proficient in English. In this case the student takes the Illinois Measure of Annual Growth in English instead.
The student is enrolled in an alternative Education program, including an adult education program, or high school equivalency certificates.

References

Education in Illinois
Standardized tests in the United States
School examinations
Achievement tests
Secondary education in the United States